Kingston: Confidential is an American mystery crime drama that aired on NBC for 13 episodes during the spring of 1977, following the success of a 1976 made-for-TV movie entitled Kingston. The series was produced by R.B. Productions, Inc. and Groverton Productions, Inc. in association with Universal Television.

Synopsis
The series starred Raymond Burr as R.B Kingston, a powerful media magnate similar to William Randolph Hearst, who owns numerous newspapers and TV stations. In his spare time, he and a group of his employees solve crimes. Co-starring in the series were Art Hindle, Pamela Hensley, and Linda Galloway.

Cast
Raymond Burr as R.B. Kingston
Art Hindle as Tony Martin
Pamela Hensley as Beth Kelly

Episodes

External links
  
  

NBC original programming
Television series by Universal Television
1970s American crime television series
Television series about journalism
English-language television shows
1977 American television series debuts
1977 American television series endings
Television shows set in San Francisco